Rubén Galván (7 April 1952 – 14 March 2018) was an Argentine football who played as a midfielder  for Club Atlético Independiente for most of his career. At international level, he was part of the Argentina squad that won the 1978 FIFA World Cup on home soil.

Club career
Galván is one of the most decorated players in the history of Argentine football with four Copa Libertadores, two Nacional Championships and a World Cup title to his name.

Galván was part of the Independiente team that won four consecutive Copa Libertadores titles between 1972 and 1975. He was also part of the team that won back to back Nacional championships in 1977 and 1978.

In 1980, he had a short spell with Estudiantes de La Plata but he retired later that year at age 27.

Personal life
Nicknamed el Negro, Galván had a bout with Hepatitis C that required a liver transplant in 2007. He died of cirrhosis in March 2018.

Honours
Independiente
Copa Libertadores: 1972, 1973, 1974, 1975
Intercontinental Cup: 1973
Primera División Argentina – Nacional: 1977, 1978

Argentina
FIFA World Cup: 1978

References

External links
 
 

1952 births
2018 deaths
Argentine footballers
Argentina international footballers
Association football midfielders
Club Atlético Independiente footballers
Estudiantes de La Plata footballers
1978 FIFA World Cup players
Copa Libertadores-winning players
FIFA World Cup-winning players
People from Formosa Province
Argentine Primera División players